Çiğdem Balım Harding is a senior lecturer at Indiana University. Balım is also the director of graduate studies and as the director of language instruction in the Department of Near Eastern Languages and Cultures.

Çiğdem Balım received her B.A. at Hacettepe University in 1974 and her Ph.D. at the University of Washington in 1979.

Publications 
The Balance of Truth: Essays in Honour of Geoffrey Lewis. (Co-editor and contributor) İstanbul: İSİS, 2000. 370p. 
World Bibliographical Series: Turkey. Oxford: ABC-Clio Press, 1999. 407p. (Collator, Editor and contributor) 
Turkey: Political, Economic and Social Challenges for the 1990s. (Co-editor and contributor) Leiden: Brill, 1995. 307p. 
Meskhetian Turks: An Introduction to their History, Culture, and U.S. Resettlement Experience. Co-author. Washington D.C. CAL Publications, October 2006.

External links 
Çiğdem Balım Harding
Indiana University

Turkish emigrants to the United States
University of Washington alumni
Indiana University faculty
Living people
American academics of Turkish descent
Year of birth missing (living people)